Ronald Wilson Reagan College Preparatory High School (RWR) is a high school located at 4965 South 20th Street in the Town of Lake neighborhood of Milwaukee, Wisconsin, USA. It is a part of Milwaukee Public Schools (MPS).

Formerly known as Town of Lake College Preparatory High School, the school changed its name following the death of former President Ronald Reagan in June 2004. The renaming was approved by the Milwaukee Board of School Directors on September 29, 2004, with the official renaming ceremony taking place on June 3, 2005. Ronald Wilson Reagan College Preparatory High School became an International Baccalaureate (IB) World School. Reagan has an alternating day schedule. The system is known as an A Day and B day system to the students.

History 
2004 it had 100 students. By 2010 it had 1,000 students, and so many students applied for admission that the school had a wait list.  In the year of 2022, MPS breaks ground on multi-million dollar expansion at Reagan that would be split into three phases the first phase of the project is being funded by $9 million in federal emergency relief funds to help schools move forward from the pandemic. The first phase is also funded by private donors and other fundraising efforts. Phase two funding is currently underway. MPS says the total cost of all three phases is estimated at $22–25 million. 
Phase 1

New gym, equipped with brand new hardwood flooring, bleachers, sound system, and team locker rooms

Lobby, concessions, bathrooms

Six outdoor tennis courts.

Science wing with STEM labs

Phase 2

New fitness center

Soccer field

Two additional tennis courts

Parking lot and storage space

Phase 3

Field house and turf athletic field.

References

External links
 

High schools in Milwaukee
International Baccalaureate schools in Wisconsin
Reagan
Public high schools in Wisconsin
Educational institutions established in 2004
2004 establishments in Wisconsin